Percy Augustus Derry (5 October 1859; 13 October 1928) was a British Anglican priest, most notably the Archdeacon of Auckland from 1914  until his death.

Price was born in Plymouth, educated at Harrow and Trinity College, Oxford;  and ordained in 1882. His first curacy was at Holy Trinity, Stockton-On-Tees and his second in Sunderland.  He held incumbencies in Rawtenstall, Norbiton, Gateshead and Sedgefield.

References

1859 births
Alumni of Trinity College, Oxford
Archdeacons of Auckland
1928 deaths
People educated at Harrow School
Clergy from Plymouth, Devon